The In the Flesh Tour, also known as the Animals Tour, was a concert tour by the English rock band Pink Floyd in support of their 1977 album Animals. It was divided in two legs: one in Europe and another in North America. The tour featured large inflatable puppets, as well as a pyrotechnic "waterfall", and one of the biggest and most elaborate stages to date, including umbrella-like canopies that would rise from the stage to protect the band from the elements.

This was the only tour in which Pink Floyd played songs from Animals live. Pink Floyd would never again play songs from Animals during their tours, but the flying pig still appeared with different designs. Only Roger Waters would continue playing songs from Animals live. This tour was also the only tour where Pink Floyd played the entire Wish You Were Here (1975) album.

History

Pink Floyd's marketing strategy for the In the Flesh Tour was very aggressive, filling pages of The New York Times and Billboard magazine. To promote their four-night run at Madison Square Garden in New York City, there was a Pink Floyd parade on 6th Avenue featuring pigs and sheep. Although the Animals album had not been as commercially successful as the previous two, the band managed to sell out arenas and stadiums in America and Europe, setting scale and attendance records. In Chicago, the band played to an estimated audience of 95,000; in Cleveland and Montreal, they set attendance records for those venues by playing to about 80,000 people.

This was the Floyd's first tour since 1973 not to use female backing singers. Augmenting the band were sax player Dick Parry (who occasionally played keyboards out of view of the audience) and guitarist Snowy White, who also played bass on "Sheep", "Pigs (Three Different Ones)" and "Welcome to the Machine". Roger Waters played electric guitar on "Sheep" and "Pigs" and acoustic guitar on "Welcome to the Machine".

In the first half of the show, the band played all of Animals in a different sequence than the album, starting with "Sheep", then "Pigs on the Wing (Part I)", "Dogs", "Pigs on the Wing (Part II)" and "Pigs (Three Different Ones)".

At some venues, paper sheep and pigs designed by Tim Hunkin were fired over the audience and parachuted back to earth. Some venues prohibited this, however.

During "Pigs (Three Different Ones)", Waters shouted the number of the concert on the tour (such as "1–5!" for the fifteenth show) so recordings of the shows would be easy to distinguish from each other.  The second half of the show comprised the Wish You Were Here album in its exact running order ("Shine On You Crazy Diamond (Parts I–V)", "Welcome to the Machine", "Have a Cigar", "Wish You Were Here" and "Shine On You Crazy Diamond (Parts VI–IX)"). This was the first time "Welcome to the Machine" and "Wish You Were Here" were played live, with the latter being played differently than the studio album. It featured an extended guitar solo, a reprise of the second verse and Richard Wright closing the song with a piano solo. The encores were "Money" and often "Us and Them" from The Dark Side of the Moon. At the Oakland, California show on 9 May they played "Careful with That Axe, Eugene" as a second encore, the first time it had been played since 1974 and the last time it was ever performed.  

During the tour, Waters began to exhibit increasingly aggressive behaviour, and would often scold disruptive audiences who lit off fireworks, and yelled and screamed during the quieter numbers. In the New York shows they had to use local workers as lighting technicians due to union problems with their own crew. They had several difficulties with the workers; for example, Waters once had to beckon one of the spotlights to move higher when it only illuminated his lower legs and feet while he was singing.

The final night of the tour on 6 July at Montreal's Olympic Stadium ended with Pink Floyd performing a second encore of "Drift Away Blues" as the roadies dismantled the instruments in front of the insatiable audience who refused to let the band leave the stadium. David Gilmour sat out the final encore as he was unhappy with the band's performance that night. Snowy White played a bluesy guitar solo in Gilmour's place. A small riot at the front of the stage followed the band's eventual exit.  Earlier that night, Waters spat in the face of a disruptive fan; The Wall grew out of Waters' thoughts about this incident, particularly his growing awareness that stardom had alienated him from his audience. "It was a funny gig," recalled guitarist Snowy White. "It was a really weird vibe… I used to just do my job. But it was interesting to look across the stage and see Roger spitting at this guy at the front… It was a very strange gig. Not very good vibes."

Personnel
David Gilmour – lead electric guitars (except as noted); lap steel guitar on "Shine On You Crazy Diamond, Part VI"; lead and backing vocals; bass guitar on "Pigs On the Wing, Part 2" (second US leg only)
Roger Waters – bass guitar (except where noted); lead and backing vocals; electric rhythm guitar on "Sheep" and "Pigs (Three Different Ones)"; acoustic guitar on "Pigs on the Wing, Parts 1 and 2" and "Welcome to the Machine"
Richard Wright – keyboards; backing vocals
Nick Mason – drums; percussion
Additional musicians:
Snowy White – guitars (harmony lead on "Dogs", lead on "Pigs on the Wing, Part 2", "Have a Cigar" and "Shine On You Crazy Diamond" (link from Part VI to Part VII, dual lead on Part VIII and harmony lead Part IX, 12-string acoustic guitar on "Wish You Were Here"); backing vocals; bass guitar on "Sheep", "Pigs (Three Different Ones)"; lead guitar on "Welcome to the Machine".
Dick Parry – saxophones, backing keyboards

Set list
A typical 1977 set list would include the following:

First set – Animals
 "Sheep"
 "Pigs on the Wing, Part 1"
 "Dogs"
 "Pigs on the Wing, Part 2"
 "Pigs (Three Different Ones)"

Second set – Wish You Were Here
 "Shine On You Crazy Diamond, Parts I–V"
 "Welcome to the Machine"
 "Have a Cigar"
 "Wish You Were Here"
 "Shine On You Crazy Diamond, Parts VI–IX"

Encore
 "Money"
 "Us and Them" (only performed on 23 January, 1 February, 16 March, 18 March, 22 April, 26 April, 30 April–1 May, 4 May, 9–10 May, 25 June–6 July)

Second encore

 "Careful with That Axe, Eugene" (performed once on 9 May 1977 in Oakland, California)
 "Drift Away Blues" (blues improvisation performed once on 6 July 1977, Montreal, Quebec, in response to an aggressive audience)

Tour dates

Box office score data

References

Citations

Sources

External links
Brain Damage.co.uk

Pink Floyd concert tours
1977 concert tours